Festuca rupicola, the furrowed fescue, is a species of cool-season grass in the family Poaceae. It is native the warm-temperate Old World; from the Atlas Mountains of Africa, then France and much of central and eastern Europe through to Central Asia and on to Manchuria, and as far south as Saudi Arabia and Iran. A tussock-former, it is considered a typical dominant species of ancient species-rich grasslands.

References

rupicola
Flora of Morocco
Flora of Algeria
Flora of France
Flora of Central Europe
Flora of Southeastern Europe
Flora of Eastern Europe
Flora of West Siberia
Flora of the Caucasus
Flora of Central Asia
Flora of Altai (region)
Flora of Saudi Arabia
Flora of Iran
Flora of Afghanistan
Flora of China
Plants described in 1858